The Berry State Aid Bridge spans the Niobrara River in Cherry County, Nebraska near Valentine, Nebraska.  It is a historic Pratt through truss bridge that is listed on the National Register of Historic Places.

Also known as the Niobrara River Bridge and identified as NEHBS No. CE00-225, it was built during 1920–21.  It was listed on the National Register of Historic Places in 1992.

It replaced an original bridge at the site that was built in 1899, which was moved about five miles to replace another bridge, and which is now also NRHP-listed as Brewer Bridge.  During construction of the new Berry State Aid Bridge, a dynamite blast damaged it, but it was completed by June 1921.

References

External links 

Road bridges on the National Register of Historic Places in Nebraska
Bridges completed in 1921
Bridges in Cherry County, Nebraska
National Register of Historic Places in Cherry County, Nebraska
Pratt truss bridges in the United States